Thalassotalea profundi is a Gram-negative, rod-shaped and motile bacterium from the genus of Thalassotalea which has been isolated from a scleractinian coral from the Yap seamounts from the Pacific Ocean.

References

External links
Type strain of Thalassotalea profundi at BacDive -  the Bacterial Diversity Metadatabase

Alteromonadales
Bacteria described in 2017